Else Ury's Nesthäkchen is a Berlin doctor's daughter, Annemarie Braun, a slim, golden blond, quintessential German girl. The ten book Nesthäkchen series follows Annemarie from infancy (Nesthäkchen and Her Dolls) to old age and grandchildren (Nesthäkchen with White Hair). Volume 10 (1925) describes the education, courtship and marriage of Annemarie’s granddaughter, Marietta, and Annemarie’s first great grandchild.

Plot summary
The year is 1973. The twenty-six year old Marietta lives in Berlin with Grandparents Rudolf Hartenstein and Annemarie Braun Hartenstein. She works, as part of her studies, in a kindergarten, where she is a favorite "aunt." Together with cousin Gerda she attends a women's school in order to be a youth counselor, a popular profession in the nineteen-twenties for modern, socially engaged women. From her twin Anita she has grown more and more distant. She is smitten with Horst, son of her grand-uncle Klaus, but Horst is enamored of Anita, and travels to Brazil to be with her. Anita's family expects her to marry Horst, but she gets engaged, to everyone’s surprise, to Ricardo Orlando, the son of wealthy neighbors.
One day Marietta notes a similarity between the kindergarten child Lenchen and Lotte, the foundling, who still lives in the Hartenstein house with the Kunzes, the household servants. It turns out that Lenchen’s grandmother was also Lotte's grandmother and Lenchen’s mother is Lotte's aunt. Lotte remains with the Kunzes, but is happy to have found her relatives and maintains contact with them.
Marietta accompanies a group of children who travel to the seaside to relax. Lotte stays on the estate of her grand-uncle Klaus. Here she receives the news that her grandfather Rudolf is blind. Surgery restores his eyesight.
Marietta travels with her grandparents to Italy and in Genoa visits relatives of her paternal grandmother. She meets Horst, who has returned from Brazil. The two grow closer. After a shared experience during an earthquake, Horst confesses his love to Marietta.
The novel ends with Horst and Marietta's wedding and Annemarie and Rudolf's Golden Wedding Anniversary. The whole family assembles, and Anita brings her little daughter Rosita, Annemarie's first great-grandchild, to the celebration.
In 1928, Ury revised and adapted a chapter ("The Radio") to reflect the modern technology.

Genre

The Nesthäkchen books represent a German literary genre, the Backfischroman, a girls' novel that describes maturation and was intended for readers 12 – 16 years old. A Backfisch (“teenage girl”, literally “fish for frying”) is a young girl between fourteen and seventeen years of age. The Backfischroman was in fashion between 1850 and 1950. It dealt overwhelmingly with stereotypes, traditional social images of growing girls absorbing societal norms. The stories ended in marriage, with the heroine becoming a Hausfrau. Among the most successful Backfischroman authors, beside Else Ury, were Magda Trott, Emmy von Rhoden with her Der Trotzkopf and Henny Koch. Ury intended to end the Nesthäkchen series with volume 6, Nesthäkchen Flies From the Nest, describing Nesthäkchen's marriage. Meidingers Jugendschriften Verlag, her Berlin publisher, was inundated with a flood of letters from Ury's young fans, begging for more Nesthäkchen stories. After some hesitation, Ury wrote four more Nesthäkchen volumes, and included comments about her initial doubts in an epilogue to volume 7, Nesthäkchen and Her Chicks.

Author
Else Ury (November 1, 1877 in Berlin; January 13, 1943 in the Auschwitz concentration camp) was a German writer and children's book author. Her best-known character is the blonde doctor's daughter Annemarie Braun, whose life from childhood to old age is told in the ten volumes of the highly successful Nesthäkchen series. The books, the six-part TV series Nesthäkchen (1983), based on the first three volumes, as well as the new DVD edition (2005) caught the attention of millions of readers and viewers.

References

German children's literature
Fictional German people
German books
Child characters in literature
Children's fiction books
1925 children's books